The discography of pop girl band Feminnem consists of three studio albums, one compilation and 17 singles. The most popular singles are "Volim te, mrzim te", "2 srca 1 ljubav", "Call Me", "Sve što ostaje", "Lako je sve" and "Sve što ti nisam znala dati".

Albums

Studio albums

Compilation albums

Singles

As lead artist

Promotional singles

As featured artist

Music videos

References

Discographies of Croatian artists
Pop music discographies